John Street (30 May 1928 – 26 April 2019) was an English professional footballer who played as a wing half.

Career
Born in West Derby, Liverpool, Street played for signed for Tranmere Rovers, Southport, Bootle Athletic, Reading, Barrow and Netherfield.

He died in Leeds on 26 April 2019.

References

1928 births
2019 deaths
English footballers
Tranmere Rovers F.C. players
Southport F.C. players
Bootle Athletic F.C. players
Reading F.C. players
Barrow A.F.C. players
Kendal Town F.C. players
English Football League players
Association football wing halves